The Bearn beaked dace (Leuciscus bearnensis) is a putative species of cyprinid fish, recorded from several localities in the Adour drainage in France.

Description
The Bearn beaked dace is distinguished from other western European members of the genus Leuciscus by having a keel which runs from its nape to the origin of the dorsal fin, a projecting snout which has a rounded tip and a projecting upper jaw, the dorsal profile of head and body shows a distinct hump; the snout is 32-35% of the length of the head; and the lateral line has around 47-52 scales. It also has thick, fleshy lips and a large eye, the diameter of them being approximately a fifth to a quarter of the length of the head. It grows to 280mm in standard length.

Distribution
The Bearn beaked dave occurs only in the drainage basin of the Adour in south-western France

Habitat and ecology
The Bearn beaked dace is found in streams, especially in sections of the streams which have clear water and current with cool, deep pools.

See also
Beaked dace
Long-snout dace

References 

Leuciscus
Taxa named by Émile Blanchard
Fish described in 1866